"Incident at Neshabur" is the fourth track from the 1970 Santana album Abraxas. Co-written by pianist Alberto Gianquinto and Carlos Santana, the instrumental has several jazz-inspired rhythm and time signature changes.

Origins, composition and meaning
As Carlos Santana stated, "Neshabur is where the army of Toussaint Louverture – who was a black revolutionary – defeated Napoleon in Haiti. So that's what it's about. I think by writing songs like 'Incident at Neshabur' and 'Toussaint L'Overture,' we felt we were our own kind of revolutionary [...] Alberto Gianquinto, our pianist on Abraxas, helped us a lot putting it together. The first part of the music is from Horace Silver's 'Señor Blues.' The slow part is [...] from Aretha Franklin's 'This Girl's In Love With You.'"

There seems to be no place called Neshabur on Haiti or associated with the Haitian Revolution, nor has there been a single event in which the French army under Napoleon (who was never on Haiti) was defeated by the rebels under Toussaint (who had by then died in a prison cell in France). Possibly Santana confused the 1804 Haiti massacre, in which almost the entire white population of Haiti was killed, or with the destruction and subsequent massacre of the entire population of Nishapur (also called Neshabur) in current day Iran by the Mongols in 1221.

Releases
As well as Abraxas, this song appears on several compilations such as Lotus, Viva Santana!, The Best of Santana Vol. 2, Santana and Shorter at Montreux and Santana.

In the live album Fillmore: The Last Days which includes works from 14 different bands, Santana presents the song to critical acclaim. Allmusic describes the performance as "strong showing" and, despite negative review of the album, Hooterollin' Around writes that "only Santana really stands out, with 'Incident at Neshabur' and a unique version of Miles Davis's 'In a Silent Way.'"<ref name=Allmusic>Planer, Lindsay. [http://www.allmusic.com/album/fillmore-the-last-days-mw0000200714 Fillmore: The Last Days] at Allmusic. Retrieved April 11, 2013</ref>

The performance is shown in the music documentary film Fillmore'' released on June 14, 1972.

References

1970 singles
Santana (band) songs
1970 songs
Columbia Records singles